Coma (Komá) was a village near Heracleopolis Magna in Lower Egypt in late antiquity. It was famed as the birthplace of St. Anthony, whose hagiography claimed his family was wealthy and owned sizable estates in the area in the early 3rd century AD.

References

Citations

Bibliography
 .

Former populated places in Egypt